OzIris is  a steel inverted roller coaster designed by Bolliger & Mabillard operating at Parc Astérix in France since 7 April 2012. It is only one of two Bolliger & Mabillard inverted coasters in France, the other being The Monster at Walygator Parc. It is named after the Character Iris from the French comic Asterix.

Ride
OzIris includes five inversions after the lift hill that stands  in height. After the initial drop, a dive loop follows going  upside-down (OzIris is the first inverted roller coaster to feature a dive loop). A corkscrew comes after the tunnel, then an upward turn to the next inversion a zero-G roll, after this inversion the track follows a twisted course until reaching the main brake zone, and then back into the station.

Theme
OzIris is part of a 2012 new egyptian themed zone inspired by one of the Asterix comic book series Asterix and Cleopatra (as well as the movie The Twelve Tasks of Asterix) which expanded the park by ten percent. With exotic plants, palm trees, rocks, lake, Egyptian monuments and a huge temple, the new area combines the characteristic of the Asterix cartoon with this custom design roller coaster. With the new theme for the park, the Zierer roller coaster Périférix was rethemed to SOS Numérobis to fit the theme.

Storyline
After walking outside below security nests, riders step into Iris' temple. In there, riders get to learn about different experiences Iris made with hypnotising, and they also get hypnotised. The coaster consists in Iris' ultimate experience: making people fly. (Hence the inverted coaster) Before the train is dispatched, riders can hear Iris' voice saying his hypnotising catchphrase "By Osiris and by Apis, you are now birds! Yes, birds!"

Awards
In 2012, OzIris was ranked by Amusement Today's Golden Ticket Awards as the fifth-best new ride (tied with Skyrush at Hersheypark), garnering six percent of the vote.

See also
 2012 in amusement parks

References

External links

 

Roller coasters in France
Bandes dessinées in amusement parks
Articles containing video clips
Inverted roller coasters manufactured by Bolliger & Mabillard